Sergio Bailey  (born August 21, 1994) is a former American football wide receiver. He played college football at Eastern Michigan.

College career
After attending Grossmont College, Bailey transferred to Eastern Michigan after his sophomore season in 2015. In his two seasons, and 25 games played at Eastern Michigan, Bailey racked up 1,746 receiving yards with 114 receptions and 16 touchdowns. In his senior year, he played 12 games, recording 54 receptions for a career-high 878 yards and nine touchdowns. He played in 13 games his junior year in 2016, leading all EMU receivers with 60 receptions for 868 yards and seven touchdowns.

Professional career

Tampa Bay Buccaneers
Bailey was signed by Tampa Bay Buccaneers as an undrafted free agent on April 30, 2018. On August 26, 2018, he was placed on injured reserve after injuring his ankle during pre game warm up before the third pre season game against the Detroit Lions. He was waived on May 6, 2019.

Seattle Dragons
Bailey signed with the Seattle Dragons of the XFL on January 24, 2020. He was waived on February 25, 2020.

Los Angeles Wildcats
Bailey signed with the Los Angeles Wildcats on March 12, 2020. He had his contract terminated when the league suspended operations on April 10, 2020.

Personal life
In 2020, he opened the Surf & Soul Spot restaurant in the College Area/La Mesa which he co-owns with a childhood friend who is a chef.

References

External links
Tampa Bay Buccaneers bio
Eastern Michigan Eagles bio

1994 births
Living people
American football wide receivers
Eastern Michigan Eagles football players
Players of American football from San Diego
Tampa Bay Buccaneers players
Seattle Dragons players
Los Angeles Wildcats (XFL) players